Tranbjærg may refer to:
Tranbjerg J, a suburb